Asbjørn Andersen (31 December 1922 – 20 December 1970) was a Norwegian footballer. He played in one match for the Norway national football team in 1953. He was also named in Norway's squad for the Group 1 qualification tournament for the 1954 FIFA World Cup.

On club level, Andersen spent seven years in the Norwegian Main League playing as a forward for Vålerenga, having previously played for Strong. His son Yngve Andersen also became a footballer, who played 14 seasons for Vålerenga as a midfielder, gaining a reputation as one of the "hardest" players in the club's history.

References

External links
 

1922 births
1970 deaths
Footballers from Oslo
Norwegian footballers
Norway international footballers
Vålerenga Fotball players
Association football forwards